The Russia national beach handball team is the national team of Russia. It is governed by the Handball Union of Russia and took part in international beach handball competitions.

In reaction to the 2022 Russian invasion of Ukraine, the International Handball Federation banned Russian and Belarus athletes and officials, and the European Handball Federation suspended the national team of Russia as well as Russian clubs competing in European handball competitions. Referees, officials, and commission members from Russia will not be called upon for future activities. And new organisers will be sought for the YAC 16 EHF Beach Handball EURO and the Qualifier Tournaments for the Beach Handball EURO 2023, which were to be held in Moscow. In addition, it refused to allow competitions to be held in Russia. The Russian Handball Federation failed in its appeal against the decision to exclude Russia's teams from continental competition, which was rejected by the European Handball Federation Court of Handball.

Results

World Championships
2004 – 3rd place
2006 – 9th place
2008 – 8th place
2010 – 6th place
2012 – 4th place
2014 – 7th place
2018 – 6th place
2022 – Disqualified

World Games

* invitational sport

References

External links
Official website
IHF profile

Beach handball
National beach handball teams
Beach handball